American singer and songwriter Tyrese has released seven studio albums and twelve singles. According to Billboard Tyrese has sold 3.69 million albums in the U.S.

Albums

Studio albums

Compilations

Mixtapes

Singles

Featured singles

Music videos

Guest features
Gibson also features on:
Better Dayz by Tupac Shakur
Hoodstar by Chingy
Rap-Murr-Phobia by Keith Murray
Unrestricted by Da Brat
U-Turn by Brian McKnight
After the Storm by Monica
"I Wanna Feel Your Rumba" by Roselyn Sánchez
Blue Streak soundtrack
Why Did I Get Married? soundtrack
"Respect My Conglomerate" by Busta Rhymes
"My Way" by Usher 
"Angel of Mine" by Monica 
"Rain" by SWV 
"Love" by Keyshia Cole 
"Entourage" by Omarion 
"I Can Transform Ya" by Chris Brown 
"Telephone" by Lady Gaga and Beyoncé 
"Last Chance" by Ginuwine 
Untitled by R. Kelly
Nothing but the Beat by David Guetta
The Weigh In by DMX
"Beautiful" by Akon 
"Up Down (Do This All Day)" by T-Pain

References

External links

 
 
 Official website
 

Discographies of American artists
Rhythm and blues discographies